Papal Arbitration was a form of international arbitration used between warring Roman Catholic countries where the Pope tried to bring both sides to peace. A recent example was the Papal mediation in the Beagle conflict between Argentina and Chile.

References

Arbitration
Foreign relations of the Holy See